Live And Beyond is the first, live album by Eric Johnson's side-project Alien Love Child. The album was recorded in 2000, Texas and features Chris Maresh on bass guitar  and Bill Maddox on drums with guest vocals by Malford Milligan. It also features one studio recorded track, "World of Trouble". The song "Rain" written by Chris Maresh was nominated for a Grammy Award for Best Pop Instrumental Performance in 2002.

Track listing
 "Zenland" (Johnson) – 5:53
 "Last House On The Block" (Johnson/Maddox) – 11:13
 "Rain" (Maresh) – 4:08
 "Enzo Shuffle" (Johnson) – 3:01
 "Once A Part Of Me" (Johnson) – 7:16
 "Don't Cha Know" (Jimmie Vaughan) – 3:53
 "The Boogie King (tribute to John Lee Hooker)" (Johnson) – 4:29
 "Elevator Sky Movie" (Johnson) – 2:34
 "Shape I'm In" (Johnson) – 5:35
 "World of Trouble" (Johnson) – 3:40

Personnel
 Eric Johnson - Guitar, vocals, Piano
 Chris Maresh - Bass guitar, vocals, Bass Keys
 Bill Maddox - drums
 Stephen Barber - Hammond B3 Organ
 Malford Milligan - vocals

External links
Eric In The Raw - Austin Chronicle: Dec, 1999
Mixed Notes - Austin Chronicle: Feb, 2000
For the Record (or Is It CD?) - Austin Chronicle: Aug, 2000
Eric Johnson's Alien Love Child Comes Alive On Favored Nations

2000 debut albums
Eric Johnson albums
2002 live albums
Favored Nations live albums